The Primetime Emmy Award for Exceptional Merit in Documentary Filmmaking is handed out annually at the Creative Arts Emmy Award ceremony since 2005. Entries are reviewed by a jury on the basis of the "filmmaker's expressed vision, compelling power of storytelling, artistry or innovation of craft, and the capacity to inform, transport, impact, enlighten, and
create a moving and indelible work that elevates the art of documentary filmmaking." Entrants are ineligible for Outstanding Informational Series or Special and Outstanding Documentary or Nonfiction Special.

Winners and nominations

2000s

2010s

2020s

Total awards by network

 HBO – 10
 PBS – 5
 Nat Geo – 2
 A&E – 1
 CNN – 1
 Netflix – 1
 Pluto - 1

References

Exceptional Merit in Documentary Filmmaking
American reality television series
Awards established in 2005